Lieutenant General James Guthrie Harbord (March 21, 1866 – August 20, 1947) was a senior officer of the United States Army and president and chairman of the board of RCA.

Early life
Harbord was born in Bloomington, Illinois, the son of George W. and Effie (Gault) Harbord. His family moved when he was four, and Harbord was raised in Pettis County, Missouri and Lyon County, Kansas. He graduated from Kansas State Agricultural College, later renamed Kansas State University, with a Bachelor of Science degree in 1886. After unsuccessfully applying to the United States Military Academy, Harbord taught school, and afterwards taught at the agricultural college. In January 1889, Harbord enlisted in the United States Army, joining the 4th Infantry Regiment as a private. He served in the enlisted ranks until July 1891, and advanced to corporal, sergeant, and regimental quartermaster sergeant. In August 1891, Harbord was commissioned as a second lieutenant in the 5th Cavalry Regiment. He received a Master of Science degree from Kansas State Agricultural College in 1895.

Start of military career
Harbord's first overseas experience came as a member of the occupation army in Cuba after the Spanish–American War. On January 21, 1899, during an extended leave, he married Emma Yeatman Overshine, daughter of Brigadier General Samuel Ovenshine. In 1901, he was promoted to captain and transferred from Cuba, where he has served initially as quartermaster and commissary for the 10th Cavalry Regiment, and later as aide-de-camp and adjutant-general of the department of Santiago and Puerto Principe.

After serving briefly in the Secretary of War office, he requested and received transfer to duty in the Philippines with the 11th Cavalry Regiment. He then served as Assistant Chief of the Philippine Constabulary from 1903 to 1909 and again from 1910 through 1913. By late April 1914 he was commanding the unit defending the California border at Calexico. In 1916, he was on the Mexican border with Brigadier General John J. Pershing, pursuing Pancho Villa.

World War I

When the United States entered World War I in April 1917, Harbord selected by General Pershing to be his chief of staff in France and promoted to brigadier general. Together with Pershing and thirty other generals, he set sail for England on 28 May 1917. Harbord worked closely with Pershing, now the commander of the American Expeditionary Forces (AEF) on the Western Front, on the buildup of the American Expeditionary Force (A.E.F.) in France, including the shipping schedules of American forces being sent to Europe.  Following a great German offensive against the Western Front on March 21, 1918, the English and French armies were in retreat, and the need for American troops was urgent.  Previously agreed to arrangements to provide 120,000 servicemen a month for three months was cast aside when General Pershing was informed by the English that by using confiscated Dutch shipping, over 300,000 soldiers could be sent a month.  However, due to manpower attrition within the British Expeditionary Force (B.E.F.), its combat divisions were reduced in strength by 25%, and with the breakthrough on the front, the English were asking that only infantry and machine gun battalions be sent over, and all other units be held back.  The American policy on this matter was quite different: General Pershing was sent to France to organize American Armies under American leadership; the idea that its combat units would be used solely as replacement units, or as reinforcements, for foreign countries was unthinkable.  President Wilson would not agree to this.  He thought the idea would not go over well with the American public, and it risked preventing an American army from ever being formed.  In secret conversations, General Pershing even said he was willing to risk the fall of France, because the United States would still carry on the war against the Kaiser; if his forces were stripped away from him and the allies lost, then Germany would win complete victory.  For his part, Prime Minister Clemenceau thought this plan appealed to the romantic side of America's intervention.

During a Supreme War Council meeting in Versailles on March 28, President Wilson shifted his position on American ground forces by allowing the temporary duty of A.E.F. combat units in the English and French ranks (Joint Note #18).  This was confirmed in, "The London Agreement" of April 27. However, at the next Supreme War Council meeting in Abbeville, held a month later, other troops were allowed, and Pershing held that the latest agreement was in force.<ref>Smyth, Donald, "Pershing: General of the Armies, pg. 118</ref> This brought rebuke and a letter from Prime Minister Clemenceau to President Wilson. In a follow up conversation between Lord Reading, the English Ambassador to the United States, and General Harbord, the ambassador said the English would be willing to supply the transportation of 120,000 American infantry and machine gun unit personnel to France, if the United States could supply the men.  General Harbord says the statement was like, "the sun breaking through the clouds" because, "If Great Britain can give us the ships to carry infantry alone, she could not refuse to carry troops from any other arm of the service.  Accordingly, I said to him, 'Give me the ships, and I will furnish 120,000 men a month.'"  When the ships arrived, the ship captains were instructed to accept only infantry and machine gun units.  When Lord Reading found out that complete divisions were assembling, he was furious.  When he was told that he must have misunderstood his conversation with Harbord, it looked like a conspiracy was in the works by the American generals.  As a result of this, in May 1918, General Pershing transferred out much of his staff who he said, 'were to complacent about themselves, and how things are run around here'.  The first to go was General Harbord, who was sent forward to the trenches to command a Marine Brigade.  However, due to General Harbord's decision, the American position prevailed,Greenhalgh, Elizabeth, Foch in Command, pgs. 362-363, 432-433Lloyd George, David, Vol V, pgs. 439-440 and full American divisions kept coming, so much so that by the time of the Armistice, the A.E.F. was two million men strong, two full American armies were formed, and a third was ready and deployed to the Rhineland in January 1919.  In all, 40 complete divisions had arrived, 30 were fielded, and 10 were under temporary British control. A complete list of A.E.F. divisions can be found here.

In June 1918, Harbord was succeeded by James W. McAndrew as AEF chief of staff, and assigned to command of the 4th Marine Brigade. The brigade, whose adjutant was Holland Smith, later famous during World War II, was serving as part of the 2nd Division. On July 15 Harbord was briefly given command of the division itself. He immediately saw action, commanding the U.S. Marines at the famous battles of Château-Thierry and Belleau Wood.

After generals Richard Blatchford and his replacement, Francis Kernan, had failed to organize an adequate delivery of supplies to the US troops in France, John J. Pershing asked Harbord in August 1918 to take the job. Harbord introduced several reforms to the Services of Supply (SOS) and achieved almost instant improvements. The task of anticipating the arrival of divisions in France, and their type, and having in place the correct amount of supplies for them at the rear, toward the front, and at the front, was all worked out.Russell, pgs. 502-03 It was at Harbord's insistence that SOS became fully integrated among the American, English, and French armies. Pershing's trust in Harbord went so far that Jim Lacey wrote in his Pershing biography "if a problem were outside Harbord's ability to solve, it was not solvable by mortal man".

Post-World War I
Following the war, he was promoted to permanent major general and was awarded both the Army Distinguished Service Medal and Navy Distinguished Service Medal. The citation for his Army DSM reads:

Harbord was also awarded numerous foreign decorations, which included: Legion of Honor (Commander) (France); Croix de Guerre with two palms (France); Order of the Crown (Grand Officer) (Belgium); Order of St Michael and St George (Knight Commander) (Great Britain); Order of Saints Maurice and Lazarus (Commander) (Italy); Order of Prince Danilo I (Grand Officer) (Montenegro); Order of Polonia Restituta (Grand Officer) (Poland); and La Medalla de Solidaridad (second class) (Panama).

The Harbord Report

In August 1919, President Woodrow Wilson sent a fact-finding mission to the Middle East, headed by Harbord, to report on Turkish–Armenian relations in the wake of the Armenian genocide. As chairman of the Harbord Commission, upon returning to the United States, Harbord wrote Conditions in the Near East: Report of the American Military Mission to Armenia, which was a summary of the expedition that provided various details of the mission. The report includes maps, statistics, and a historical analyses of the country and its population. In addition to such details, Harbord collected evidence and information regarding the massacres of Armenians. Harbord's report stated that "the temptation to reprisals for past wrongs" would make it extremely difficult to maintain peace in the region. The final conclusion of the report was the inclusion of Armenia in the possible American mandate for Asia Minor and Rumelia since a mandate for Armenia alone was not deemed feasible under these conditions. Harbord was also sent to investigate the feasibility of the Balfour Declaration, which supported the creation of a Jewish state in Palestine, taken from the Ottoman Empire during the war.

Radio Corporation of America
In 1922, Harbord retired from the Army to become President of the Radio Corporation of America. In 1928, Harbord took a leave of absence to campaign for Herbert Hoover for president. He officially retired as RCA president in 1930 and was succeeded by David Sarnoff. Harbord then succeeded Owen D. Young as RCA's chairman of the board, and he served until July 1947, when he was succeeded by Sarnoff.

In 1932, Harbord was a candidate for vice president at the Republican National Convention. He finished in third place on the first ballot with 161 3/4 votes; 634 1/4 went to incumbent Charles Curtis, and 182 3/4 were cast for Hanford MacNider. The delegates then moved to make Curtis' re-nomination unanimous.

 Death and legacy 

In 1942, the U.S. Congress passed legislation allowing retired Army generals to be advanced one rank on the retired list or posthumously if they had been recommended in writing during World War I for a promotion which they did not receive, and if they had received the Medal of Honor, the Distinguished Service Cross or the Distinguished Service Medal.  Under these criteria, Harbord and William M. Wright were eligible for promotion to lieutenant general, and they were advanced on the retired list effective July 9, 1942.

Harbord's civilian awards included the honorary degree of LL.D. from Kansas State Agricultural College (1920), Trinity College (Hartford, Connecticut) in 1924 and Yale University in 1928.

Harbord died in Rye, New York on August 20, 1947. He was buried at Arlington National Cemetery.

 Writings 
 The American Expeditionary Forces, Its Organization and Accomplishments (1929) Link
 Leaves From a War Diary (1925) Link
 The American Army in France 1917-1919 (1936) Link
 The 40 Year March of Radio (1943) Link

See also

Witnesses and testimonies of the Armenian genocide
 "United Kingdom National Archives, CAB 23-6", (troops): pgs. 16-17, 164-165, and 172-173 of 457
 "United Kingdom National Archives, CAB 24-46", (dutch shipping): pg. 282 of 343

Footnotes

 Bibliography 
 Archive.org (sign in to view highlighted footnotes and bibliographies)
 Callwell, C.E., Field Marshall Sir Henry Wilson, Vol II, London: Cassell, 1927
 Clemenceau, Georges, Grandeur and Misery of Victory, London: George Harrp, 1930
 Greenhalgh, Elizabeth, Foch in Command, New York: Cambridge, 2011
 Harbord, James G., Leaves From a War Diary, New York: Dodd Mead, 1925
 Harbord, James G., The American Army in France, Boston: Little Brown, 1936
 Harbord, James Guthrie. The American Expeditionary Forces: Its Organization and Accomplishments (Evanston Publishing Company, 1929)
 Lloyd George, David, War Memoirs of David Lloyd George, Vol V, Boston: Little Brown, 1936
 Marcosson, Issac F, S.O.S. America's Miracle in France, New York: Curth, 1919
 Pershing, John J., My Experiences in the World War, Vol I, New York: Frederick Stokes, 1931
 Russell, Thomasa H, America's War For Humanity, Detroit: F.E. Ritz, 1919
 Stewart, Richard, American Military History, Vol. II, Washington, D.C.: Center of Military History, 2005
 The Times (of London), archive
 The United States Army in the First World War, 1917–1919, Volume 3, Washington D.C.: US Army, 1989 pdf download
 UK National Archives, online
 Smythe, Donald, Pershing: General of the Armies, Bloomington, IN: Indiana University Press, 1986

Further reading
 Cooke, James J. Pershing and His Generals: Command and Staff in the AEF (Praeger, 1997).
 Dawes, Charles, A Journal of the Great War, Vol I, Boston: Houghton Mifflin, 1921
 Dawes, Charles, A Journal of the Great War, Vol. II, Boston: Houghton Mifflin, 1921
 Hirrel, Leo P. "Supporting the Doughboys: US Army Logistics and Personnel During World War I." Ft. Leavenworth, KS Combat Studies Institute, 2017. online
 Lloyd George, David. Memoirs of David Lloyd George, 1917-1918, Boston: Little, Brown, 1936; Chapter XI The American Armies in France, pgs 395-453
 Neumann, Brian Fisher. "Pershing's right hand: General James G. Harbord and the American Expeditionary Forces in the First World War" (PhD. Diss. Texas A&M University, 2006). online

External links

Short biography of Harbord
The Evening Public Ledger news story: Foch May Hold Americans for Use at a Later Date.
 "United Kingdom National Archives, CAB 24-46", (manpower issues): pgs. 335-229 of 343
James Gutherie Harbord, Lieutenant General, United States Army, Arlington National Cemetery profile.
"The Radio Corporation's New President" by S. R. Winters, Wireless Age'', January 1923, pages 47–50.
 History.army.mil, The U.S. Army in World War I, 1917-1918

1866 births
1947 deaths
United States Army Infantry Branch personnel
United States Army Cavalry Branch personnel
American military personnel of the Spanish–American War
American television executives
Burials at Arlington National Cemetery
Kansas State University alumni
People from Bloomington, Illinois
People from Lyon County, Kansas
People from Manhattan, Kansas
United States Army generals of World War I
United States Army generals
Kansas Republicans
New York (state) Republicans
Illinois Republicans
Witnesses of the Armenian genocide
Recipients of the Distinguished Service Medal (US Army)
Recipients of the Navy Distinguished Service Medal
Commandeurs of the Légion d'honneur
Recipients of the Croix de Guerre 1914–1918 (France)
Grand Officers of the Order of the Crown (Belgium)
Knights Commander of the Order of St Michael and St George
Commanders of the Order of Saints Maurice and Lazarus
Grand Crosses of the Order of Polonia Restituta
Military personnel from Illinois